"Body Slam" is a song that was recorded by Bootsy's Rubber Band, co-written by Bootsy Collins and keyboardist Joel "Razor Sharp" Johnson.  It was released in 1982 by Warner Bros. Records. The song was never featured on any of Bootsy Collins' albums until the 1994 release of the compilation Back in the Day: The Best of Bootsy. The song is a reconstruction of the track "Countracula (This One's For You)" from the album The One Giveth, the Count Taketh Away. The single reached number 12 in Billboard Magazine's Black Singles charts. The b-side of "Body Slam" was "I'd Rather Be With You".

Musicians

Bass, Guitars, and Drums: Bootsy Collins
Strings and Things: Bootsy Collins, Joel Johnson 
Vocals: Bootsy Collins, Joel Johnson,  
Percussion: Bootsy Collins, Joel Johnson, Wes Boatman 
Grand piano: Kae Williams Jr.
Organ part: Bruce Weeden

Bootsy Collins songs
1982 songs
Songs written by Bootsy Collins